Nikita Gale (born 1983, Anchorage, Alaska) is an American visual artist based in Los Angeles, California.

Education 
Gale received a BA in Anthropology with a focus on Archaeological Studies from Yale University.
The artist received a Master of Fine Arts degree (MFA) in New Genres from the University of California, Los Angeles in 2016.

Career 
Gale's work AN ABUNDANT LOSS was recently acquired by the Pérez Art Museum in Miami.

In 2022 Gale was commissioned by BMW to create new artworks for BMW Open Work at Frieze London.

As of 2021, Gale has served on the Board of Directors for GREX, the West Coast affiliate of the A. K. Rice Institute for the Study of Social Systems (AKRI).

Exhibitions and Projects 
Solo exhibitions

 IN A DREAM YOU CLIMB THE STAIRS, Chisenhale, London, UK, 2022
 TAKERS, LAXART, Los Angeles, California, 2022
 Nikita Gale: END OF SUBJECT, 52 Walker (David Zwirner), New York, NY, 2022. Curated by Ebony L. Haynes. Reviewed in Art in America.
 Wild Frictions. Politische Poesien der Störung (Wild Frictions. Political poetries of disorder), Kunstraum Kreuzberg, Berlin, Germany, 2021
 BENEATH TONGUES, Swiss Institute, New York, NY, 2022
 Nikita Gale: PRIVATE DANCER, California African American Museum, Los Angeles, CA, 2021

Selected performances

 Nikita Gale, AUDIENCING, MoMA PS1, New York, NY, 2020

Selected group exhibitions

 Made in L.A. 2018, Hammer Museum, Los Angeles, CA, 2018
 Fictions, The Studio Museum in Harlem, New York, NY, 2017-2018

References

External links 
 Official website

1983 births
Living people
21st-century American women artists
Artists from Alaska
Yale College alumni
University of California, Los Angeles alumni
American conceptual artists
Women conceptual artists